SS General (original title: SS-Generalen) is a novel by the Danish writer Sven Hassel. It was first published in 1960 and has been translated in many languages.

Written in the first person, SS-General is based on the adventures of a group of German penal battalion soldiers in the Battle of Stalingrad. The book describes their escape from the Stalingrad siege under the leadership of a fanatical Brigadeführer of the Waffen-SS. Like all Sven Hassel's books it contains graphic descriptions of war's brutality, as well as elements of military humor.

References

External sources

Historical novels
Novels set during World War II
1960 novels
Novels set in the Soviet Union